This Is Football (known in North America as World Tour Soccer) is a football video game series that was originally developed by Team Soho until they were merged into London Studio for the next five games. Sports Director Limited took over developing the latest game.

Games

This Is Football (1999)

This Is Football 2 (2000)

This Is Football 2002 (2001)

This Is Football 2003 (2002)

This Is Football 2004 (2004)

This Is Football 2005 (2005)

World Tour Soccer: Challenge Edition (2005)

World Tour Soccer 2 (2006)

This Is Football Management (2010)

References

External links

 
Sony Interactive Entertainment franchises
Video game franchises
Video game franchises introduced in 1999